Dance Teacher is a 1952 Soviet drama film directed by Tatyana Lukashevich.

Plot 
The film tells about a guy named Aldemaro from a poor noble family who is in love with the daughter of a rich signor. He comes up with a pseudonym and, introducing himself as a dance teacher, arrives at their house.

Starring 
 Vladimir Zeldin as Aldemaro
 Mark Pertsovskiy as Belardo
 Tatyana Alekseeva as Florela
 Lyubov Dobrzhanskaya as Feliciana
 Vladimir Blagoobrazov as Tebano
 Mikhail Mayorov as Bandalino
 Yakov Khaletskiy as Tullio
 Georgiy Sorokin as Rikaredo
 S. Znamenskiy as Kornecho
 Genrietta Ostrovskaya as Lisena
 Fyodor Savostyanov as Andronio
 Boris Lesovoy as Alberigo

References

External links 
 

1952 films
1950s Russian-language films
Films based on works by Lope de Vega
Soviet black-and-white films
Soviet romantic drama films
1952 romantic drama films